is a Japanese actress, voice actress and narrator. She has played voice roles in a number of Japanese anime including Beelzebub,  Bishamon in Noragami, Petit Charat/Puchiko in Di Gi Charat, Mint in Galaxy Angel, Sinon in Sword Art Online II, Twilight/Towa Akagi/Cure Scarlet in Go! Princess Precure, Izuna Hatsuse in No Game, No Life, Amagi in Azur Lane, Celty Sturluson in Durarara!!, Kurapika in Hunter × Hunter, Raiden Shogun/Raiden Ei in Genshin Impact, Raiden Mei and Dr.MEI in Honkai Impact 3 yet also in Gun Girl Z, Akane Kurashiki in Zero Escape, Ayane Yano in Kimi ni Todoke, Fujiko Mine in later installments of Lupin the Third, Queen in Mysterious Joker, Jun Sasada in Natsume's Book of Friends, Shinku in Rozen Maiden, Haruka Nanami in Uta no Prince-sama, Kotoha Isone in Yozakura Quartet, Kanbaru Suruga in Bakemonogatari, Saber of Red/Mordred in Fate/Apocrypha, Elizabeth and Chidori in Persona 3,  Ivy Valentine in Soulcalibur, Jolyne Cujoh in JoJo's Bizarre Adventure: All Star Battle and JoJo's Bizarre Adventure: Eyes of Heaven, Wizard Cookie in Cookie Run: Kingdom, Elizabeth in BioShock Infinite, Kirari Momobami in Kakegurui and Rosetta in Punishing: Gray Raven.

Biography
Miyuki Sawashiro was born on June 2, 1985. She has a younger brother named Chiharu Sawashiro who is also a voice actor.

She participated in voice actor auditions for Di Gi Charat on May 2, 1999, and won the Special Jury Prize. During her time in high school, she stayed in Pennsylvania, where she participated in a homestay program to learn English. She takes time off to practice English when she is not busy with voiceover work.

She voiced Puchiko in the English dubbed release of Leave it to Piyoko, making her the first and one of the few Japanese voice actors to have reprised a role in English in addition to the original Japanese performance. She was not able to record for the English dub of the Di Gi Charat TV series because of a scheduling conflict.

She was affiliated with Mausu Promotion since the start of her voice acting career until August 2015 when she became affiliated with Aoni Production.

Personal life
Sawashiro announced her marriage in 2014. In 2018, her fellow voice actress Mayumi Tanaka announced that Sawashiro had successfully given birth to her first child.

Filmography

Television animation

Original net animation (ONA)

Original video animation (OVA)

Theatrical animation

Video games

Drama CDs

Gakuen Alice Drama CD released in Hana to Yume magazine, Hotaru Imai
Ludwig Kakumei, Wilhelm
Soul Eater, Patricia Thompson
Kuroshitsuji, Ciel Phantomhive
Lupin III, Fujiko Mine
Rakka Ryūsui, Yū Gojyō
Kisu Yori mo Hayaku, Teppei Kaji
Hetalia: Axis Powers drama CD volume 2, Young Austria
Tindharia no Tane, Parsley
Sword Art Online drama CD, Shino Asada/Sinon
Monogatari Series drama CD Hyakumonogatari, Suruga Kanbaru
Kokoro Connect drama CD, Himeko Inaba
Like a Butterfly drama CD, Aya Shimizu
Fate/GUDAGUDA Order drama CD, Mordred
7th Dragon 2020 & 2020-II: Tokyo Chronicle, Miroku
7th Dragon III Code: VFD Drama CD, Allie Nodens

Live-action film
Death Note: Light Up the New World (2016), Arma (voice)
The Travelling Cat Chronicles (2018), Momo (voice)

Live-action television
Natsuzora (2019), Chikako Shiramoto

Tokusatsu

Dubbing roles

Live action

Animation

Discography
 "Solitary Bullet" (Sword Art Online Character Song as Sinon)
 "Blazing Bullet" (Sword Art Online Character Song as Sinon with Yoshitsugu Matsuoka)
 "Relief Bullet" (Sword Art Online Character Song as Sinon)
 "Onegai☆Snyaiper" (No Game No Life Character Song) 
 "Red Concerto" (Go! Princess Precure Character Song) 
 "ENDLESS TORCH!" (Go! Princess Precure Character Song)
 "Rouge no Dengon" (Durarara!! Character Song)
 "Break Beat Bark" (Sword Art Online Ordinal Scale Character Song as Sinon with Ayahi Takagaki)

References

External links

Official agency profile 
Miyuki Sawashiro at GamePlaza-Haruka Voice Acting Database 
Miyuki Sawashiro at Hitoshi Doi's Seiyuu Database

1985 births
Living people
Aoni Production voice actors
Japanese stage actresses
Japanese video game actresses
Japanese voice actresses
Mausu Promotion voice actors
Voice actresses from Nagano Prefecture
Voice actresses from Tokyo Metropolis
20th-century Japanese actresses
21st-century Japanese actresses